Splicing factor, arginine/serine-rich 9, also known as SFRS9, is a human gene encoding an SR protein involved in splice site selection in alternative splicing.

Interactions
SFRS9 has been shown to interact with Y box binding protein 1 and NOL3.

References

Further reading